Acq or ACQ may refer to:
 Acheng District, a district of Harbin, China; see List of administrative divisions of Heilongjiang
 Acq, Pas-de-Calais, a commune in France
 ACQ-Kingdom Broadcasting Network, the broadcasting arm of a Philippine television evangelist, Pastor Apollo C. Quiboloy
 Action civique de Québec, a political party in Quebec City, Quebec, Canada that contests municipal elections
 Alkaline Copper Quaternary, a wood preservative
 Nuevo Continente, a defunct airline of Peru
 Ta'izzi-Adeni Arabic, a variety of Yemeni Arabic
 Waseca Municipal Airport, a public airport serving Waseca, Minnesota, US

See also 
 ACQuiring Knowledge in Speech, Language and Hearing, a journal published by Speech Pathology Australia
 ACQ Solomonic Builders Development Corporation, a company building the KJC King Dome in Davos City, the Philippines
 Special:PrefixIndex/ACQ
 Special:PrefixIndex/Acq